Ljupina is a village in Brod-Posavina County in Croatia.

Religion 
Local Roman Catholic church was firstly mentioned in 1758. It was a wooden structure next to which a new brick construction was contented in 1980.

References 

Populated places in Brod-Posavina County